Ronnie Sharp (born 1 April 1957 in Dundee) is a Scottish professional darts player who plays in the events of Professional Darts Corporation (PDC). His currently played members in the 1980s and 90s. Who competed in the British Darts Organisation and is the former captain of Scotland.  Sharp was nicknamed Pancho due to his moustache which resembled that of Francisco "Pancho" Villa.

Career

Sharp made three appearances in the Winmau World Masters before making his World Championship debut in 1990, reaching the quarter finals. He defeated Kim Jensen and John Lowe before losing to Phil Taylor, who went on to win his first world title and dominate the sport. In 1991, he lost in the first round to Cliff Lazarenko. He failed to qualify for the 1992 World Championship, but returned in 1993, beating Peter Hunt in the first round but lost in the second round to Alan Warriner.

It was the 1994 World Championship where Sharp recorded his best performance. The sport suffered a split with the BDO's top players forming a new governing body called the World Darts Council (later known as the Professional Darts Corporation). With the big names gone, Sharp was one of those who took advantage. After beating Trevor Nurse in the first round, he defeated Roland Scholten, the only seed to progress through round one in the second round. He then beat Denmark's Troels Rusel in the quarter finals before losing to Canada's John Part 5–1 in sets. Sharp was the only player to win a set against eventual champion Part in the entire tournament. Sharp did not progress further in his career, reaching only the second round in the 1995 World Championship and then quietly disappeared from the scene.  He did appear on TV's Bullseye (UK game show) series 13 where he achieved a score of 328. Due to it being 301 or more, the programme doubled this amount to £656 which was given to the contestants' chosen charity, the Kent Air Ambulance Air Appeal.

Sharp then made a comeback in the 2006 Scotland National Championship, reaching the quarter finals. He then played in the 2006 World Masters but lost in the first round to Jarkko Komula. He returned to the Scotland National Championship in 2008, but lost in the first round to the tournament's eventual winner Mike Veitch. He most recently played in the 2008 Welsh Open, reaching the last 128 stage.
Ronnie currently enjoys playing with Towerlands Sports Club in the Dreghorn League and is heavily involved with darts at county level selecting and playing for Ayrshire county team.

Sharp played started rejoining with the Professional Darts Corporation on 6 November 2021.

World Championship Performances

BDO

 1990: Quarter Finals (lost to Phil Taylor 2–4) (sets)
 1991: 1st Round (lost to Cliff Lazarenko 0–3)
 1993: 2nd Round (lost to Alan Warriner-Little 1–3)
 1994: Semi Finals (lost to John Part 1–5)
 1995: 2nd Round (lost to Andy Fordham 2–3)

External links
Ronnie Sharp's profile and stats on Darts Database
YLE Finnish public broadcasting company: Ronnie Sharp & Jamie Harvey vs. Kexi Heinäharju & Aulis Nissinen in Darts European Cup 1992 (video)

1957 births
Living people
Scottish darts players
People from Dundee
Place of birth missing (living people)
British Darts Organisation players